Plaue may refer to:

 Plaue, a city in Ilm-Kreis, Thuringia, Germany
 Plaue station, a railway junction
 Plaue, Brandenburg, a suburb of the city of Brandenburg an der Havel, Brandenburg, Germany
 Axel Plaue, a politician in Lower Saxony, Germany